West Liberty is an unincorporated community in Morrow County, in the U.S. state of Ohio.

History
West Liberty was laid out in 1837. The community was also known as Stantontown, after Jesse Stanton, a pioneer settler. A post office called Stantontown was established in 1880, and remained in operation until 1906.

References

Unincorporated communities in Morrow County, Ohio
1837 establishments in Ohio
Populated places established in 1837
Unincorporated communities in Ohio